St. Brigid's Hospital was a psychiatric hospital in Ballinasloe, County Galway, Ireland.

History
The hospital, which was designed by William Murray, opened as the Connacht Asylum in 1833. After a redrawing of the asylum district boundaries in 1850, it was renamed the Ballinasloe District Asylum. New wings were completed in 1871 and 1882. As it expanded conditions became very overcrowded with nearly 1,200 patients by the early 1900s and, having been renamed Ballinasloe Mental Hospital in the late 1920s, it accommodated some 2,000 patients by the 1950s.

The facility became St. Brigid's Hospital in the 1950s. After the introduction of deinstitutionalisation in the late 1980s the hospital went into a period of decline and closed in 2013.

References

Hospitals in County Galway
Hospital buildings completed in 1833
Hospitals established in 1833
1833 establishments in Ireland
Psychiatric hospitals in the Republic of Ireland
Defunct hospitals in the Republic of Ireland
2013 disestablishments in Ireland
Hospitals disestablished in 2013